Alexander Hamilton Doleman ( – 12 September 1914) was a Scottish amateur golfer. Doleman tied for ninth place in the 1870 Open Championship. His brothers John, William, and Frank were also golfers.

Early life
Doleman was born circa 1836 in Musselburgh, Scotland.

Golf career

1870 Open Championship
The 1870 Open Championship was a golf competition held at Prestwick Golf Club, Ayrshire, Scotland. It was the 11th Open Championship and the last to be contested for the Challenge Belt. Tom Morris, Jr. won the championship by 12 shots from Bob Kirk and Davie Strath. By winning for a third successive time Morris gained permanent possession of the Challenge Belt.

The contest took place the day after the autumn meeting of the club. A notice to prospective tournament entrants read, "On Thurs the 15th Sept. the CHAMPION BELT, given by the Prestwick Golf Club, and open to all Members of Established Golf Clubs and Professionals, will be competed for".

Details of play
Tommy Morris's first round of 47 (3-5-3-5-6-3-3-3-4-3-4-5) was two shots better than his previous record round in 1868. This gave him a five shot lead over Bob Kirk. After a second round 51 he held a five shot lead over Davie Strath. A final 51 extended his lead to 12 shots. His final score of 149 was 5 shots better than the previous record set in 1868. There were 20 starters but only 17 returned scores. Doleman's collective effort for the tournament resulted in rounds of 57-54-58=169. As an amateur, he was not eligible to receive any prize money.

Morris returned to St. Andrews by train, late on Saturday evening. A "great multitude" were there to meet him and he was carried, shoulder high, to Mr. Leslie's Golf Hotel, where his health was drunk.

Death and legacy
Doleman died on 12 September 1914 in Blackpool, Lancashire, England, aged 78.

Results in The Open Championship

Note: Doleman played only in The Open Championship.

"T" indicates a tie for a place
Yellow background for top-10

References

Scottish male golfers
Amateur golfers
Golfers from Musselburgh
1836 births
1914 deaths